
Year 229 BC was a year of the pre-Julian Roman calendar. At the time it was known as the Year of the Consulship of Albinus and Centumalus (or, less frequently, year 525 Ab urbe condita). The denomination 229 BC for this year has been used since the early medieval period, when the Anno Domini calendar era became the prevalent method in Europe for naming years.

Events 
 By place 

 Anatolia 
 Attalus I of Pergamon wins the Battle of the Harpasus in western Anatolia.

 Illyria 
 The First Illyrian War starts when the Roman Senate dispatches an army under the command of the consuls Lucius Postumius Albinus and Gnaeus Fulvius Centumalus to Illyria. Rome forces the withdrawal of Illyrian garrisons in the Greek cities of Epidamnus, Apollonia, Corcyra and Pharos and establishes a protectorate over these Greek towns.
 The Illyrian tribe of the Ardiaei is subdued by the Romans.
 The King of Macedonia, Demetrius II, dies. His nephew, Antigonus III comes to the Macedonian throne as regent for his half-cousin and the future king Philip V, who is only ten years old.
 Concerned at Rome's expansion, Antigonus III pursues a policy of befriending the Illyrians, even though the Greeks in the region support Rome in quelling the Illyrian pirates.
 The involvement of Rome in Illyria leads to the establishment of friendly relations between Rome and the enemies of Macedonia: the Aetolian League and Achaean League, which approve the suppression of Illyrian piracy.
 Aratus of Sicyon brings Argos into the Achaean League and then helps liberate Athens. This brings Aratus into conflict with Sparta.

 China 
 The Qin general Wang Jian launches a three-pronged invasion of the state of Zhao but is hindered by the Zhao general Li Mu.
 The Zhao Prime Minister Guo Kai, influenced by the machinations of Qin, executes Li Mu.

Births 
 Lucius Aemilius Paullus Macedonicus, Roman consul and general (d. 160 BC)
 Qin Er Shi, Chinese emperor of the Qin Dynasty (d. 207 BC)
 Titus Quinctius Flaminius, Roman consul and general (d. 174 BC)

Deaths 
 Demetrius II, Macedonian king from 239 BC (b. c. 276 BC)
 Li Mu, Chinese general of the Zhao State (Warring States Period)
 Margos of Keryneia, Greek general of the Achaean League

References